Alastair Andrew Spence  (1936 – 2015) was president of the Royal College of Anaesthetists for 1991 to 1994.

References

1936 births
2015 deaths
Commanders of the Order of the British Empire
Presidents of the Royal College of Anaesthetists
British anaesthetists